species of air-breathing land slugs

Keeled Jumping-slug (Hemphillia burringtoni) is a species of air-breathing land slugs, terrestrial pulmonate gastropod mollusks in the family Arionidae, the roundback slugs. Its range includes Washington and Oregon in the United States.

References

Arionidae